"Happy People" is a song by American R&B recording artist R. Kelly. Like Kelly's previous single, "Step in the Name of Love", the song is about the stepping dance. It was released on March 22, 2004, as the lead single from his second double album, Happy People/U Saved Me (2004). The song went to number 19 on the US Billboard Hot 100 and number seven on the Billboard Hot R&B/Hip-Hop Singles & Tracks chart. In some territories, it was released as a double A-side with "U Saved Me"; this issue peaked at number six in the United Kingdom.

Music video

The music video is directed by Little X.

Charts
All entries charted with "U Saved Me" except where noted.

Weekly charts

Year-end charts

Release history

"Christmas, I'll Be Steppin"

"Christmas, I'll Be Steppin'" was recorded by Kelly for the soundtrack of the movie The Best Man Holiday, and plays during the end credits. The song resembles "Happy People", but with different lyrics and a more Christmas feel to it. "Christmas, I'll Be Steppin'" is the fifth song on the official soundtrack to The Best Man Holiday and is one of the few songs that is not a cover version of another song.

Charts

References

2004 singles
2004 songs
Jive Records singles
Music videos directed by Director X
R. Kelly songs
Song recordings produced by R. Kelly
Songs written by R. Kelly